The National Museum of Medieval Art is a national museum dedicated to medieval art and history in Korçë, Albania. The museum is located on Fan Noli Boulevard in the south-east of the city of Korçë. It was established on April 24, 1980, and the building was reconstructed on October 4, 2016, with the cooperation of the city municipality and the Greek Government fund.

The museum has over 7,000 art and cultural items, mainly icons, stone, wooden, metal and textile works, representing various moments in Albania's iconography development. In the principal hall there are many works from anonymous artists of the 13th-14th centuries and well-known ones including Onufri, Onufër Qiprioti, Teacher Kostandini, Jeromak Shpataraku, David Selenica, and the Zografi Brothers.

Due to the COVID-19 lockdown in Albania, the Ministry of Culture offers 3D tours of the museum.

Gallery

References

External links

Official website
3D VirtualTour

Buildings and structures in Korçë
Museums in Albania
Museums established in 1980
Art museums and galleries in Albania
Religious museums
Tourist attractions in Korçë
Museums in Korçë